The Plantation Houses of the Alabama Canebrake and Their Associated Outbuildings Multiple Property Submission is a multiple property submission of properties that were together listed on the National Register of Historic Places.  The multiple property submission covers plantation properties that are within the Alabama Canebrake. The National Park Service has determined that all are historically or architecturally significant as a surviving group of plantation structures in what was once one of the wealthiest areas of the state.

See also
National Register of Historic Places Multiple Property Submissions in Alabama
National Register of Historic Places listings in Hale County, Alabama
National Register of Historic Places listings in Marengo County, Alabama

References

National Register of Historic Places Multiple Property Submissions in Alabama
National Register of Historic Places in Hale County, Alabama
National Register of Historic Places in Marengo County, Alabama